Lady Sophia Louise Sydney Topley (née Cavendish; born 18 March 1957) is the third child and second surviving daughter of the 11th Duke of Devonshire and his wife Deborah (née Mitford). She is the younger sister of the present duke, Peregrine Cavendish, 12th Duke of Devonshire.

Marriages
Lady Sophia has been married three times:

She married Anthony William Lindsay Murphy on 20 October 1979 and they were divorced in 1987. They had no children.

Her second marriage was to the Hon. Anthony Morrison (later the 3rd Baron Margadale), on 19 July 1988; they were divorced some time before 1999. They have two children:
 Hon. Declan James Morrison (11 July 1993)
 Hon. Nancy Lorna Sophie Morrison (22 January 1995)

She married William Topley on 25 November 1999.

Books
As Lady Sophia Murphy, she is the author of The Duchess of Devonshire's Ball (London: Sedgwick & Jackson, 1984), a photo-album of a costume ball given in 1897 by a previous Duchess of Devonshire.

Ancestry

References 

1957 births
Living people
Daughters of British dukes
Mitford family
Sophia